Doublespring Peak is an  mountain summit located in Custer County, Idaho, United States.

Description
Doublespring Peak ranks as the 41st-highest peak in Idaho and is part of the Lost River Range which is a subset of the Rocky Mountains. The mountain is set on land managed by Salmon–Challis National Forest. Neighbors include Dickey Peak 4.5 miles northwest, Mount Morrison, eight miles south, and line parent Borah Peak, the highest peak in Idaho, is 4.7 miles to the south. Precipitation runoff from the mountain's slopes drains to Willow Creek, Doublespring Creek, and to the Pahsimeroi River. This landform is unofficially named in association with nearby Doublespring Pass and Doublespring Creek which are both official toponyms adopted by the United States Board on Geographic Names.

Climate
Based on the Köppen climate classification, Doublespring Peak is located in an alpine subarctic climate zone with long, cold, snowy winters, and cool to warm summers. Winter temperatures can drop below −10 °F with wind chill factors below −30 °F.

See also
 List of mountain peaks of Idaho

Gallery

References

External links
 Doublespring Peak: Idaho: A Climbing Guide

Mountains of Idaho
Mountains of Custer County, Idaho
North American 3000 m summits
Salmon-Challis National Forest